There are 15 teams in the Sanmarinese league system. The club San Marino Calcio plays in the Italian league system.

San Marino
 

Football clubs
Football